Owls are an indie rock band from Chicago, Illinois. They were initially active from 2001-2002 and reunited in 2012. The band is composed of the original lineup of the emo band Cap'n Jazz excluding guitarist Davey von Bohlen, who had left to form The Promise Ring. The lineup has included brothers Tim Kinsella and Mike Kinsella (vocals and drums, respectively), guitarist Victor Villareal and bassist Sam Zurick. Tim Kinsella and Zurick have also played together in Joan of Arc and Make Believe. Villarreal and Zurick played together in the instrumental rock group Ghosts and Vodka. The band signed to Jade Tree on May 3, 2001, and released their debut on July 31.

Owls reunited in March 2012. The band announced via Facebook on July 22, 2013 that they had completed work on a new record after 18 months of writing and were heading into the studio to record their second studio album. In January it was announced that the album would be titled Two. It was released on March 25, 2014.

Discography
Compilations
Oil CD (released on Thick Records)
Albums
 Owls (Jade Tree Records, 2001)
 Two (Polyvinyl, 2014)

References

External links
 Owls page at Jade Tree Records
 Owls page at joanfrc.com
 Pitchfork review of 'Owls'

Polyvinyl Record Co. artists
Musical groups from Chicago
Musical groups established in 2001
Jade Tree (record label) artists
Emo musical groups from Illinois
RareNoiseRecords artists